2,4,6-Trichloroanisole (TCA) is a chemical compound that is a chlorinated derivative of anisole. TCA is a fungal metabolite of 2,4,6-trichlorophenol, which is used as a fungicide. It can be found in minute traces on packaging materials stored in the presence of fiberboard treated with trichlorophenol.

TCA has an unpleasant earthy, musty and moldy smell and is the chemical primarily responsible for cork taint in wines. TCA has also been implicated as a major component of the "Rio defect" in coffees from Central and South America, which refers to a taste described as medicinal, phenolic, or iodine-like.
TCA is usually produced when naturally occurring airborne fungi and bacteria (usually Aspergillus sp., Penicillium sp., Actinomycetes, Botrytis cinerea, Rhizobium sp., or Streptomyces) are presented with chlorinated phenolic compounds, which they then convert into chlorinated anisole derivatives. The chlorophenols can originate from various contaminants such as those found in some pesticides and wood preservatives. Chlorophenols can also be a product of the chlorine bleaching process used to sterilize or bleach wood, paper, and other materials; they can be synthesized by reaction of hypochlorites with lignin. They can also migrate from other objects such as shipping pallets treated by chlorophenols. TCA is a potent blocker of cyclic nucleotide–gated ion channels.

See also 
 2,4,6-Tribromoanisole

References

Chlorobenzenes
Phenol ethers